Vettam is a 2004 Indian Malayalam-language screwball comedy film directed by Priyadarshan based on a screenplay he had co-written with Udayakrishna-Siby K. Thomas from his story. It was produced by Menaka through Revathy Kalamandhir and distributed by Swargachitra Release. The film stars Dileep and Bhavna Pani with Kalabhavan Mani, Innocent, Janardhanan, Nedumudi Venu and Jagathy Sreekumar in supporting roles. It has over the years attained a cult status.

The movie is mainly based on the 1995 movie French Kiss  which had already been adapted in 1998 in Hindi as Pyaar To Hona Hi Tha. The comedy scenes of this movie were later adapted by the director for his 2009 Hindi movie De Dana Dan. The climax of the movie was re-used from director's 2003 Hindi movie Hungama.

Plot

A police officer is on Gopalakrishnan's ('Gopi') trail. Gopi is a petty thief and has stolen a very precious chain belonging to the Spanish Queen, from a Museum and is on the run. While on the run, Gopi meets Veena. Veena is on her way to break the marriage of her lover Felix to a tycoon's daughter. Due to fear of getting caught, Gopi hides the chain in Veena's bag but later discovers with the help of his friend Mani that it is missing. Gopi suspects that the chain is still with Veena and so he runs away from the police and follows her in her train journey.

Their journey comes to a halt when Gopi is forced to jump off the train, because of Veena who had gone to get some water and hence misses the train. Veena realises that the place was Gopi's hometown. Subsequently, he is needlessly beaten by his wicked elder brother and this leads to a fight. When Gopi's elder sister learns that he is in town, she informs him that his younger sister's marriage is fixed. Veena's opinion of Gopi changes when she realises the reason why he became a thief.

Gopi calls off his younger sister's marriage when he realised that there was a catch in it. His elder brothers were greedy of the family wealth and fixed the young girl's marriage with an unmarried and uneducated but rich old man. Gopi promises his sisters and their ailing bed-ridden father that he will find a better groom for his sister and he just needs more time. However he is unable to find the precious chain from Veena's bag. Astonishingly, Veena is seen possessing the chain and asks Gopi to accompany her in her goal if he wants the chain.

In order to fulfill his promises, Gopi sets off to find some money to fund his sister's wedding and to regain all the lost family properties. At the same Mani escapes the town with his lover Maala and all of them meet up at the hotel in Mysore where Veena's lover Felix and family are staying to get engaged.

Felix's father, Mathew 'Mathachan' has cheque bounces and needs a large amount of money to pay them off. The bride's father, Fernandez agrees to give the money (without knowing of cases pending against Mathachan) and also arranges rooms for all the guests. At the same time Mathachan's much younger and clever second wife Swarnamma is a vibrant and buxom MILF, and plans to elope with a young con man Prince. Another guest, Hamza Koya who is a womaniser looking for women to hook up, books a room under a false name, to acquaint with another woman. Meanwhile, his brother-in-law hires a professional killer Paasha to kill Koya. Yet another guest is a retired DIG of Police, Tom Uncle who is Fernandez's brother in law.

Gopi assigns Mani to meet a dealer's aide to sell the chain. Mani tells the man that he would be holding a rose flower as an identification. But the plans go awry as Kurup who is Mani's lover's father, arrives with his henchmen in search of his daughter. Mani is chased into Mathachan's room by Kurup and his men and hides in a wardrobe. Meanwhile, Kurup lands in trouble after mistakenly entering Tom uncle's room and disturbing his elderly and melodramatic wife Brigitta while she was showering and probably sees her nude. Mathachan locks the wardrobe in which Mani is hiding putting his mobile phone into it. Mani informs Gopi about the mishap using the mobile. Gopi after spotting Kurup who was holding the rose flower, mistakes him into being a dealer and fixes a deal with him. There is a comical chaotic confusion as Kurup's daughter's name is Maala, and Gopi refers to the chain as 'Maala' (in Malayalam) as well.

Paasha gets a courier holding the photo of the man (Koya) he is assigned to kill. Felix spots Veena and reports it to his dad. Mathchan goes in search of Veena knowing only the colour of her dress. He accidentally bumps into Paasha. Unfortunately, Mathachan had a photograph of himself and Fernandez with him. Paasha who is unable to see without specs, switches Koya's photo with Fernandez's photo. At the hotel reception, a  hot lady Anushee, who is actually a prostitute, arrives and Mathachan mistakes her to be Veena as she is wearing the same-coloured dress. This is the same lady whom Koya has supposed to meet and dally.

Paasha while going back to his room, bumps into a rose plant and tries to arrange it properly albeit proper vision. Now, the actual dealer of the chain - Abdullah - arrives and spots Paasha holding the flower. Both of them fix a deal and Paasha is paid money. There is an unknown confusion as Paasha was asked by his boss to snatch Koya's chain after the murder. Abdullah mistakes Paasha to be talking of the one stolen by Gopi. Mani informs Gopi that he is stuck in a wardrobe and before he can specify the room, the phone charge is exhausted. Gopi enlists the help of a waiter Sugunan to get Mani out.

Meanwhile, Paasha is now trying to kill Fernandez. Mathachan deals with the new lady who mistakes him to be Koya's man. Fernandez asks Tom Uncle to give some money to Mathachan while Mathachan asks Tom Uncle to give some of it to the lady. A Sub Inspector, Lambodaran, is staying in the hotel to get hold of Mathachan albeit not knowing his identity. Mathachan's wife Swarnamma mistakes Koya as Uncle Tom and asks him to come to her room. Koya who obviously misinterprets her to be the escort he expects, goes to her room and pays her money, which Swarnamma interprets as from Uncle Tom, and tucks inside her cupboard. By this time, Koya, turned on by her booty, loses his control and grabs her from behind. He throws the screaming Swarnamma on the bed unleashing himself on her buxom assets trying to ravish her. Swarnamma barely manages to escape his clutches though not without the horny Koya stealing a big kiss on her full cheeks (imprinting his prominent front teeth there). She naturally reports that Uncle Tom tried to molest Mathachan's wife. At the same time, the other lady Anusree, after mistaking Uncle Tom to be Koya, goes to his room and tries to seduce him, planting kisses on his cheek and forehead and later hides in his wardrobe. The waiter finds out the lady after trying to search the wardrobe. The two incidents tarnish the image of poor Tom and he is resented by his wife and other family members.

After a wedding party, Paasha falls unconscious after falling into his own traps set for Fernandez. SI Lambodaran gets Mathachan's room number and goes there only to find Mani inside the wardrobe. Mani is chased by the SI as well as Kurup. Mani runs into Paasha's room while Kurup backs off after Uncle Tom spots him.

Felix wants to settle his differences with Veena and goes to the con lady's room by mistake. After Mathachan reveals that Felix had a previous relationship with 'Veena' (while pointing to the other lady), Fernandez loses his impression of the family and decides to call off the marriage and also starts trusting Uncle Tom.

Gopi wishes to hand the chain to a dealer named Freddy and asks Veena to face him. But Freddy is caught by police and the senior officer who was behind Gopi confronts her. She doesn't give the chain back initially, but later pleads with the officer to spare the innocent Gopi's life, as Gopi had once saved the police officer's son's life from a fatal accident. She also decides to give her own money entrusted by her father, to Gopi under the name of the chain.

SI Lambodaran gets hold of Paasha trying to kill Fernandez, and shows him the photograph thereby making it clear that Mathachan had assigned him to kill Fernandez. There is great confusion among Paasha, Kurup, Mathachan, Koya and the SI regarding the various deals of 'Maala'. During the chaos, Fernandez's daughter is mistaken as Kurup's daughter and thereby kidnapped by Kurup's henchmen. Mani and Gopi understand the whole mayhem and flee the hotel. Mathachan's wife elopes, and Koya, whose money was taken away by Mathachan's wife, follows them. The entire group of people along with the two families arrive at a factory space near the hotel and a hell lot of funny confusions cause a series of comical fights, chaos, and melee, finally leading to a hilarious electric shock.

In the end Veena gives the agreed money to Gopi. However, the police officer reveals to Gopi that the chain is still with him and that Veena had pleaded to avoid a case in Gopi's name.

Gopi had talked to Felix about Veena and how much she loves him. He promises Felix a large sum of money which he will pay off from the necklace's price. He does not reveal this to Veena. However Veena realizes Gopi's sacrifice for her despite having his own problems. Veena calls off her wedding with Felix as she realises that he only longs for riches and does not love her at all. Gopi proposes to her and she agrees. The film ends with both of them setting off to start a new journey of their life.

Cast

Dileep as Gopalakrishnan (Gopi)
Bhavna Pani as Veena
Kalabhavan Mani as Mani, Gopi's friend
Innocent as K. T. Mathew (Mathachan), Felix's father
Janardhanan as Fernandez (Achayan)
Nedumudi Venu as Retd.DIG Tom Uncle IPS, Fernandez's brother-in-law
Jagathy Sreekumar as Anthappan / Paasha, a professional killer
Cochin Haneefa as Kurup, Meghamala's father
Sukumari as Brajitta, Tom's uncle's wife
Jagadish as Hotel Waiter Sugunan
Mamukkoya as Hamsakoya/ Raman Kartha
Mithun Ramesh as Felix Mathew
Spadikam George as SI Lambodharan
Bindu Panicker as Swarnamma, Mathachan's second wife
Manka Mahesh as Susy, Fernandez's wife
Radha Ravi as IG Krishnaswamy IPS-Special Branch
Ajith Kollam as Abdullah
Geetha Vijayan as Anusree, Prostitute
Kalabhavan Navas as Prince, Swarnamma's secret lover
Sruthi Nair as Meghamala, Kurup's daughter
Vimal Raj as CI Dineshan
Sona Nair as 'Oppol', Gopi's elder sister
Baiju as Prathapan, Gopi's elder brother
Kalamandalam Kesavan as Parameshwaran, Gopi's father
Machan Varghese as Babu, Kurup's helper
Santhosh as Karunan, Gopi's elder brother
Ramu as Madhava Menon, Gopi's eldest brother
Ambalapuzha Raju as Mohanan, Train Station employee
Kunchan as Santhosh, Train ticket examiner
Nandhu as Rajeevan, thief
Nandu Pothuval as Sugunan, train passenger
Hakim Rawther as Kasim, Man at tea shop
Ajayan Adoor as Sathyan, Hotel Manager
D. Philip as Rameshan, Veena's father
Vallathol Unnikrishnan as Varkeyachan, Mathachan's brother-in-law
Krishna Prasad as Ganeshan, Hotel Manager
Kannan Pattambi as Chackochan, Kurup's helper
Joy Badlani as Virendhram
Vijayan Peringode as Chandran, Veena's paternal uncle
Priya Nambiar as Indu, Gopi's youngest sister
Sheetal Bedi  as Special appearance in the song "Makkassayi Makkassayi"
Jayaram as Taxi driver (uncredited appearance)

Production
The film's producer Suresh Kumar was in deep debt during the post-production stages of the film. An Ernakulam court has ordered a stay on Vettam unless Suresh Kumar pays the due of Rs 64 Lakhs Shenoys Cinemax. Dhanya theatre in Trivandrum had also advanced Rs 50 Lakhs to the producer on condition that the film would be screened at their chain of theatres in Quilon and Changanacherry. Jyothika was initially cast as Veena but due to scheduling conflicts she was replaced by Bhavna Pani. A major part of the film was set and filmed at Howard Johnson's The Monarch Hotel in Ooty.

Soundtrack

The songs were composed by the duo Berny-Ignatius and the film score was composed by S.P. Venkatesh. Lyrics were written by Rajeev Alunkal, B.R. Prasad and Nadirsha.

Release and reception
The film was released on 20 August 2004 on the occasion of Onam along with other films like Kazhcha, Natturajavu , Sathyam. The film was flop at the box office. The film was made with a budget of 2.25 crores. However, the film was only able to collect 4 crore at the box office in its final run, according to a report by Sify.com. It has over the years attained a cult status.

References

External links
 

2004 films
2000s Malayalam-language films
2004 romantic comedy films
Films with screenplays by Udayakrishna-Siby K. Thomas
Indian remakes of American films
Indian romantic comedy films
Indian screwball comedy films
Films shot in Ooty
Films shot in Pollachi
Films shot in Palakkad
Films scored by Berny–Ignatius
Films directed by Priyadarshan